Tenagodus weldii is a species of sea snail, a marine gastropod mollusc in the family Siliquariidae, common name the slit worm snails. It was first described by Julian Tenison-Woods in 1876. This species is endemic to New Zealand.

References

Siliquariidae
Gastropods of Australia
Gastropods of New Zealand
Gastropods described in 1876